The QAC Road or Quilon Athletic Club Road is a short city road in Kollam, India. The road connects decades-old 'Quilon Athletic Club' and Lal Bahadur Shastri Stadium with NH-66 and Kollam-Kulathupuzha road through Kollam Cantonment area. QAC Road is considered as a major district road comes under Kollam PWD Roads Division. Southern Railways' Staff Quarters is situated on the side of QAC Road.

Local public and private institutions beside QAC Road
 Lal Bahadur Shastri Stadium
 Quilon Athletic Club
 Railways Staff Quarters
 Kerala Water Authority Office

See also
 Kollam
 Asramam Link Road
 Residency Road
 Kollam Port Road

References

QAC Road